Athens 2010 Youth Olympics Bid is the official bid of Athens in order to host the first Youth Olympics. The Athens bid is one of the strong favourites as the Ancient Olympics started here, the Modern Olympics did as well. Athens was the host of the 1896 Summer Olympics the 2004 Summer Olympics and seven IOC Sessions. As stated on their website, Athens is eager to host the Games not only to utilize their state of the art venues, but to establish the Youth Olympics in the "birthplace" of the Modern and Ancient Games.

Athens has sentiment on its side, as well as all the recently built venues from 2004.

Venues and infrastructure
The Athens 2010 Youth Olympic Games sport competitions will be held in existing venues, with only one exception, which is a stadium currently under construction.

The Games will be organised in two clusters. Ten venues surround the Youth Olympic Village in Aghios Andreas, a spectacular setting on the Aegean coast where media stayed during the Athens 2004 Olympic Games.

Athletes will be able to enjoy comfortable, modern accommodation next to the beach with all the amenities for relaxation and cultural activities right on their doorstep.

The other ten main venues lie in the city centre, based around the Olympic Sports Complex. The Opening Ceremony will take place in the Olympic Stadium and the striking Panathinaiko Stadium, dating back to 1896, will be the venue for the Closing Ceremony.

Ancient Olympia will host the shot put and beach-format wrestling. Athletes competing in other events will have the opportunity to travel to Olympia to watch the competitions and to be inspired by the Olympic history all around them.

Existing infrastructure, including airport, roads, public transport and telecommunications fully meet the requirements of the operations and services to be provided. Athens also benefits from the tremendous legacy of human expertise from 2004.

Education and culture
Greece has been offering Olympic education for decades through the work of the International Olympic Academy in Olympia. Benefiting from this experience, Athens would put in place an effective educational and cultural programme soon after being selected as host city. Through interactive digital tools, young people worldwide would have the opportunity to share in the excitement and passion of the Olympic spirit.

The lighting of the Olympic Flame and Torch Relay will raise awareness and enthusiasm around the world, as the days count down to the inaugural Youth Olympic Games.

The Games will burst into life with a spectacular Opening Ceremony in the renowned Olympic Stadium. Participants will be able to learn about such timeless Olympic values as respect, friendship and excellence not only through organised educational activities but also through the experience of living, training and competing together in Athens. The Youth Olympic Village already offers numerous facilities ideally suited for seminars and group activities. In addition, full advantage will be taken of the remarkable cultural heritage of Athens, ranging from the new Museum of the Olympic Games to the ageless beauty of the Parthenon.

Rich diversity of cultures
Educational and cultural programmes will of course be designed specifically for the young audience, using the latest multimedia technology and taking account of the rich diversity of cultures among the participants.

Athens, already a magnet for young visitors from around the world, will welcome the athletes for the experience of a lifetime.

Impact 
The Youth Olympic Games in Athens will resonate throughout the world, inspiring a new generation of Olympic heroes and building firm foundations for 2014 and beyond.

Bid Committee 
Minos X. Kyriakou – President of the Hellenic Olympic Committee
Minos Kyriakou is a prominent and respected international businessman who has devoted many years of his life to supporting sport in Greece and around the world. Mr Kyriakou’s passion for sports has been demonstrated through his unwavering dedication to athletics, in particular.

Mr Kyriakou is a former Council Member of the International Association of Athletics Federations (IAAF) and is currently a member of the IAAF Foundation.

He was responsible for reviving the now highly successful ‘Tsiklitiria’ international athletics event that in 2002 was recognised by the IAAF as among the seven leading track and field meetings in the world.

Minos Kyriakou is the President of the Hellenic Olympic Committee, Honorary Life President of the Greek Athletics Federation, President of the International Olympic Academy, General Secretary of the International Mediterranean Games Committee and Chairman of the Torch Relay Commission.

Nikitas Kaklamanis – 1st Vice President
Mayor of Athens

Dr Stavros Douvis – 2nd Vice President
General Secretary of Sports

Members
Charalampos Nikolaou- Vice President of the IOC
Emmanouil Katsiadakis- General Secretary of the Hellenic Olympic Committee
Thomas Stamou - Director General of General Secretariat of Sports
Petros Synadinos - Former CEO of the Athens 2004 Organising Committee, Member of Hellenic Olympic Committee
Konstantinos Vernikos- Journalist
Pavlos Kanellakis - Member of Hellenic Olympic Committee
Evangelos Soufleris - Member of Hellenic Olympic Committee
Konstantinos Papadopoulos - Representative of General Secretariat of Sports
Iakovos Filippousis - Member of Executive Committee

Outcome
Athens was eliminated alongside Bangkok and Turin on January 21, 2007.  The IOC report stated the plan had a budget far beyond the scope desired. Athens reduced its budget from the initial cost, but the new budget of $273 million was still above the IOC's expectations.  It was also higher than other bids.

In addition, Athens did not provide enough hotel guarantees and concerns were high that the venues were too widespread and would require the involvement of several municipalities.

References

External links

Official bid site
Athens 2010 Official site

2010 Summer Youth Olympics bids
Sport in Athens
Greece at the Youth Olympics